Mathias Lykke Hansen (born June 22, 1984) is a Danish former professional football player.

External links
Vejle Boldklub profile
Danish national team profile

Living people
1984 births
Danish men's footballers
Vejle Boldklub players
Association football midfielders